Pleione praecox is a species of orchid found from the west-central Himalaya to China (southern Yunnan). It is the type species of the genus Pleione.

Images

References 

praecox
Orchids of Yunnan